Flying Squadron (Italian: Rondini in volo) is a 1949 Italian adventure film directed by Luigi Capuano and starring Massimo Serato, Dina Sassoli and Umberto Spadaro.

The film's sets were designed by Alfredo Montori.

Cast
Massimo Serato as Ufficiale d'aviazione
Dina Sassoli as Elena Baldini
Umberto Spadaro as Don Leoni
Gianfranco Magalotti as Massimo
Mirko Ellis as Mario	
Mario Ferrari as Generale Artesi		
Gabriele Ferzetti as Ufficiale d'aviazione	
Giovanni Grasso jr. as capo Dei Contadini
Maria Grazia Francia as Figlia Del Capo Dei Cantadini
Guido Celano 
Andrea Checchi  
Paolo Panelli 
Carlo Sposito
Erminio Spalla
 Claudio Ermelli
 Giovanna Scotto
 Franco Pesce

References

External links

1949 films
1940s Italian-language films
Films directed by Luigi Capuano
Italian aviation films
Italian black-and-white films
Italian adventure films
1949 adventure films
Films scored by Alessandro Cicognini
1940s Italian films